Cham-e Astan (also Romanized as Cham-e Āstān; also known as Cham-e Āsīn) is a village in Kuhdasht-e Shomali Rural District, in the Central District of Kuhdasht County, Lorestan Province, Iran. At the 2006 census, its population was 156, in 32 families.

References 

Towns and villages in Kuhdasht County